The National University of the West (UNO) is an Argentine national university, situated in San Antonio de Padua, Merlo Partido, Buenos Aires Province.

It was established on November 11, 2009, by National Law 26,544. The campus was formally inaugurated on September 16, 2011 - the 35th anniversary of the "night of the pencils" assault against a group of left-wing La Plata students at the height of the Dirty War. The school offers degrees in eight disciplines, including business administration, public administration, physical education, nursing and computer science.

See also

Science and Education in Argentina
Argentine Higher Education Official Site 
 Argentine Universities
 Science and technology in Argentina

Notes

2009 establishments in Argentina
West
Educational institutions established in 2009
Universities in Buenos Aires Province